Thomas J. Gill House is a historic home located at Laurinburg, Scotland County, North Carolina. It was built in 1904, and is a -story, three bay by three bay, frame dwelling, with Stick Style and Bungalow design elements.  The interior is in the Colonial Revival style. It has a hipped roof, exterior stucco and brackets, and full-width front porch.  Also on the property is a contributing gazebo. It was the home of North Carolina State Treasurer Edwin M. Gill (1899-1978).

It was added to the National Register of Historic Places in 1982.

References

Houses on the National Register of Historic Places in North Carolina
Queen Anne architecture in North Carolina
Colonial Revival architecture in North Carolina
Houses completed in 1904
Houses in Scotland County, North Carolina
National Register of Historic Places in Scotland County, North Carolina